The Coat & Badge is a pub in Putney, London, England.

Location 
The pub is on the northern side of Lacy Road at number 8, on the corner with Walker's Place, and there is an outdoor garden.

History 

The pub dates from the Edwardian era, it was recorded at Coopers Lane which is now Lacy Road.  The name is after Doggett's Coat and Badge, the oldest rowing race in the world, started by Irish comedian Thomas Doggett and now run by the Watermen's Company.

Management 
The pub was managed by Geronimo, along with the nearby Half Moon, but is now managed by Young & Co who took over the Geronimo chain in 2010.

References

External links 
 The Coat & Badge pub website

Pubs in the London Borough of Wandsworth
Putney